Abreu - Carga e Trânsitos, Lda., often simply abbreviated to Abreu Carga, is one of the main transport companies in Portugal, and operates air, land and ocean freight services from, to and within Portugal.

Warehouses and offices are located in the surroundings and airports of Lisbon, Porto, Funchal (Madeira) and Ponta Delgada (Azores). New and modern facilities opened in early 2000s in Lisbon and Porto with a total of 30.000 m2 (11.000 m2 covered area).

Abreu Carga is owned by Viagens Abreu, the leading leisure travel agency in Portugal.

References

External links 
Official website (English and Portuguese)

Logistics companies of Portugal
Transport companies of Portugal
Privately held companies of Portugal